The following is a list of notable parks, gardens, and outdoor spaces in Berlin, Germany.

Zoos
 Berlin Zoological Garden
 Tierpark Berlin

Parks
 Barnim Nature Park
 Großer Tiergarten
 Grunewald (forest)
 Henriette Herz Park
 Körnerpark
 Mauerpark
 Pfaueninsel
 Treptower Park
 Tempelhofer Feld - A park opened in 2010 at the former site of Berlin Tempelhof Airport
 Theodor Wolff Park
 Viktoriapark
 Volkspark Friedrichshain
Volkspark Hasenheide
 Volkspark Mariendorf

Gardens

 Botanical Garden in Berlin
 Britzer Garten
 Erholungspark Marzahn

See also
 Palaces and Parks of Potsdam and Berlin

References

External links 
 Parks in Berlin 

Landscape architecture
Landscape design history
Berlin
Berlin